Oxynops is a genus of flies in the family Tachinidae.

Species
Oxynops anthracinus (Bigot, 1889)
Oxynops macrocera (Townsend, 1927)

References

Diptera of North America
Diptera of South America
Exoristinae
Tachinidae genera
Taxa named by Charles Henry Tyler Townsend